American rapper and fashion designer Ye (/jeɪ/ YAY), commonly known by his birth name Kanye West, has expressed views on many political and social issues. West unsuccessfully ran for President of the United States in 2020, focusing on his opposition to abortion. On November 20, 2022, West announced that he is running again for the presidency in the 2024 election. Since launching his 2024 campaign, West's political advocacy has been heavily focused on promoting antisemitism. On December 1, 2022, West stated that he admired Adolf Hitler, denied the Holocaust, and identified as a Nazi.

West supported Barack Obama in 2008 and 2012, Hillary Clinton in 2016, and Donald Trump in 2020. West opposes abortion, capital punishment, and welfare. He supports gun rights and previously had supported gay marriage.

Social issues

Abortion
In October 2019, West (a devout Evangelical Christian) spoke out against abortion, citing his belief in the Sixth Commandment; "thou shalt not kill". In an October 2022 interview with Tucker Carlson, Kanye West stated that he is pro-life, claiming that "there are more Black babies being aborted than born in New York City at this point. That 50% of Black death in America is abortion". That same month, he repeated these claims on a podcast with Lex Fridman, saying that "Fifty percent today of ... Black people's deaths today is abortion.... It's not racism; that's too wide of a term. It's genocide and population control that Black people are in today in America, that is promoted by the music and the media that Black people make, that Jewish record labels get paid off of".

Death penalty
In 2020, West said he was against capital punishment.

Homophobia
West has spoken in support of gay marriage. In a 2005 MTV News interview with Sway Calloway, West spoke out against homophobia in hip hop music, recalling: "I remember my cousin told me that another one of my cousins was gay, and at that point was the turning point where I was like, 'Yo, this is my cousin, I love him. I've been discriminating against gays. Do I discriminate against my cousin?"
In a 2022 interview for Censored.TV with Gavin McInnes, West stated: "You know, the thing about that, 95 percent of gay people don't get married anyway. So it's a very liberal thing that is put up to like cause these headlines. All my policies are gonna follow the Bible."

Mental health
In a 2022 interview with record executive Wack 100, West alleged that his previous diagnosis of having bipolar disorder was a misdiagnosis from a Jewish doctor, believing that he is "more autistic than bipolar."

Books
Although West has written several books, he has shown aversion to books and the act of reading. During a podcast episode of Alo Yoga'''s "Alo Mind Full" podcast, West admitted that he had never read any book. He said, "Reading is like eating Brussels sprouts for me. And talking is like getting the Giorgio Baldi corn ravioli."

Religious freedom
West supports faith-based organizations and restoring school prayer in the United States.

Prison reform
In September 2018, West called for the alteration of the Thirteenth Amendment because of a loophole that suggests it is legal to enslave convicts.

During a meeting with Trump the following month, West called the Thirteenth Amendment a "trap door".

In October 2019, West stated during a performance with the Sunday Service Choir that people were too busy discussing music and sports instead of focusing on a broken system that he claims imprisons "one in three African-Americans...in this country." The following month, West alleged that the media calls him "crazy" to silence his opinion, connecting this to the incarceration of African-Americans and celebrities.

On his album Jesus Is King (2019), West discussed the Thirteenth Amendment, mass incarceration, criticized the prison–industrial complex, and connected three-strikes laws to slavery.

 Economics 
In a 2022 interview with McInnes, West advocated for removing Jewish people from positions of power, and firing them from influential positions. West has also advocated for a Christian-controlled state.

In May 2018, West espoused the "Democratic plantation" theory that welfare is a tool used by the Democratic Party to keep black Americans as an underclass that remains reliant on the party. During a September 2018 special guest appearance on Saturday Night Live, after the show had already gone off the air, West alleged to the crowd that it was a Democratic Party plan "to take the fathers out [of] the home and promote welfare."

The following month, West alleged that homicide was a byproduct of a "welfare state" that destroyed black families. Jelani Cobb challenged West's claim in The New Yorker (at least as much as it applied to Chicago), arguing that "the catalysts for violence in that city predate the 'welfare state' and the rise of single-parent black households, in the nineteen-seventies." He pointed to findings from Chicago Commission on Race Relations regarding the violence of the Chicago race riots of 1919 and a 1945 study entitled Black Metropolis, published by sociologists St. Clair Drake and Horace Cayton, which Cobb wrote, "detailed the ways in which discrimination in housing and employment were negatively affecting black migrants." He also noted similar observations made by W. E. B. Du Bois in Philadelphia, in 1903.

Other
In September 2013, West was widely rebuked by human rights groups for performing in Kazakhstan, which has one of the poorest human rights records in the world, at the wedding of authoritarian President Nursultan Nazarbayev's grandson. West was reportedly paid US$3 million for his performance. West had previously participated in cultural boycotts, joining Shakira and Rage Against the Machine in refusing to perform in Arizona after the 2010 implementation of stop and search laws directed against potential illegal aliens.

In February 2016, West again became embroiled in controversy when he posted a tweet seemingly asserting Bill Cosby's innocence in the wake of over 50 women alleging he had sexually assaulted them.

Politics
In 2005, West appeared as a guest host during A Concert for Hurricane Relief, a benefit concert for the victims of Hurricane Katrina, alongside actor Mike Myers. West deviated from his script, criticizing the media's apparent disparity of the treatment of black victims as opposed to white victims of the hurricane. He finished his speech by stating the now-infamous quote "George Bush doesn't care about black people", criticizing the United States' federal response to Katrina.

Future president Barack Obama consulted with West during his 2008 presidential campaign, and West would perform at a Democratic National Committee party that August to support Obama's run for president, revealing on stage that he wished; "[his] momma could have seen this day". West would later post a portrait of Obama on his blog after his election win, with a message reading "HI MOM, OBAMA WON!". West performed alongside artists Fall Out Boy and Kid Rock at Obama's Youth Inaugural Ball in 2009, praising the newly-inaugurated President Obama during his set.

In September 2012, West donated $1,000 to Barack Obama's re-election campaign, and in August 2015 he donated $2,700 to Hillary Clinton's 2016 campaign. He also donated $15,000 to the Democratic National Committee in October 2014.

In September 2015, West announced that he intended to run for President of the United States in 2020. He later implied on Twitter that he intends to run for president in 2024 due to Donald Trump's win in the 2016 elections. West later confirmed this in an interview in September 2018, saying that his main political concern is health care in the United States. On December 13, 2016, West met with President-elect Trump. According to West, "I wanted to meet with Trump today to discuss multicultural issues. These issues included bullying, supporting teachers, modernizing curriculums, and violence in Chicago. I feel it is important to have a direct line of communication with our future President if we truly want change."

West previously stated he would have voted for Trump had he voted. In February 2017, however, West deleted all his tweets about Trump in purported dislike of the new president's policies, particularly the travel ban. West reiterated his support for Donald Trump in April 2018 in a text to Ebro Darden where he said "I love Donald Trump... I love Donald Trump." West also posted a picture wearing a Make America Great Again hat alongside a series of tweets defending President Trump. Trump later retweeted several of West's tweets.

Following his return to Twitter in April 2018, West tweeted "I love the way Candace Owens thinks." The tweet was met with controversy among some of West's fans.

In May 2018, West said in an interview with radio host Charlamagne tha God that he had been asked by a friend "What makes George Bush any more racist than Trump?" This was possibly alluding to his previous controversial condemnation of Bush as not caring about black people. West said "racism isn't the deal-breaker for me. If that was the case, I wouldn't live in America."

On October 11, 2018, West visited the Oval Office for a meeting with President Trump to discuss a range of issues. He and several other musicians watched Trump sign the Music Modernization Act. Later in October 2018, West and his wife visited the president of Uganda, Yoweri Museveni, a noted Trump supporter, who said they held "fruitful discussions" about promoting tourism and the arts.

In 2018, West expressed support for gun rights, saying "the problem is illegal guns. Illegal guns is the problem, not legal guns. We have the right to bear arms". West remarks received support from the National Rifle Association.

The same month, West donated $73,540 to progressive Chicago mayoral candidate Amara Enyia. The donation was the exact amount Enyia needed to pay a fine she received for not filing a campaign finance reports during her abbreviated 2015 mayoral run.

Also in the same month, West was reported to have given his support to the Blexit movement, a campaign by Owens to encourage black Americans to abandon the Democratic Party and register as Republicans. Media reports suggested West had advised on the design of the campaign's logo, and branded merchandise, including T-shirts. However, West denied being the designer and disavowed the effort, tweeting "My eyes are now wide open and now realize I've been used to spread messages I don't believe in. I am distancing myself from politics and completely focusing on being creative !!!"

In 2019, West re-affirmed his support for Trump. That year, he expressed his opposition to abortion, and condemned those who wish to remove religion from the public square. In an interview with GQ in January 2020, West implied he would be voting for President Trump. Months later, West launched his own run for president and said in a subsequent interview that he was "taking off the Trump hat" due to Trump hiding in a bunker during the George Floyd protests. In September 2020, West expressed his support for Armenia during the 2020 Nagorno-Karabakh conflict,.

In December 2022, West urged his followers on Instagram to vote for Republican candidate Herschel Walker in the U.S. Senate runoff election in Georgia.

Race and antisemitism
Race relations
In 2018, West criticized the Thirteenth Amendment, citing the provision allowing slavery as punishment for a crime.

In May 2018, West caused controversy when he said, "When you hear about slavery for 400 years... for 400 years? That sounds like a choice. You were there for 400 years and it's all of y'all. It's like we're mentally imprisoned." during an appearance on TMZ. West responded to the controversy on Twitter stating, "Of course I know that slaves did not get shackled and put on a boat by free will. My point is for us to have stayed in that position even though the numbers were on our side means that we were mentally enslaved" and "The reason why I brought up the 400 years point is that we can't be mentally imprisoned for another 400 years. We need free thought now. Even the statement was an example of free thought. It was just an idea. Once again I am being attacked for presenting new ideas." Later, on August 29, 2018, West offered up an emotional apology for his slavery comment during a radio interview with 107.5 WGCI Chicago.

On October 3, 2022, during his Yeezy SZN 9 fashion show in Paris, West wore a shirt with the script "WHITE LIVES MATTER", a move described by Forbes as controversial. According to the Anti-Defamation League, the phrase is a white supremacist slogan that was created in response to Black Lives Matter protests against police brutality. Conservative commentator Candace Owens posed for a photo with West, while wearing a matching shirt with the slogan. Following the event, West posted a story on his Instagram, stating: "Everyone know that Black Lives Matter was a scam now it's over you're welcome."

In November 2016, West told black people to "stop focusing on racism", but clarified that his support for Trump did not mean he did not "believe in Black Lives Matter." In June 2020, West participated in the George Floyd protests and donated $2million to help victims of the rioting that took place during demonstrations. He also paid off Floyd's daughter's college tuition. The following month, West stated that one of his priorities would be to end police brutality, adding that "[the] police are people too".

 Antisemitism 

2013
During a November 26, 2013 interview on The Breakfast Club, West explained why he believed that Barack Obama had problems pushing policies in Washington: "Black people don't have the same level of connections as Jewish people... We ain't Jewish. We don't get family that got money like that." In response to his comments, the Anti-Defamation League stated: "There it goes again, the age-old canard that Jews are all-powerful and control the levers of power in government." On December 21, 2013, West told a Chicago radio station that "I thought I was giving a compliment, but if anything, it came off more ignorant. I don't know how being told you have money is an insult."

2022

On October 7, West appeared to suggest in a post on Instagram that Puff Daddy is controlled by Jews; in response, Instagram locked his account. After being unable to post on Instagram, and previously not tweeting for nearly two years, on October 8, West tweeted that he was "going death con 3"  on Jewish people, prompting media attention. The tweet was widely condemned as antisemitic, and West's Twitter account was temporarily locked. Prior to sending out the controversial tweet, he had posted an image of himself with Mark Zuckerberg on his Twitter, criticizing Zuckerberg for "kick[ing] him off Instagram".

On October 11, Vice reported on unaired segments of an interview of West by Fox News's Tucker Carlson that aired a few days prior, which contained West making several conspiratorial, racist, and antisemitic statements. West said that Margaret Sanger was a "known eugenic[ist]" and founded Planned Parenthood with the Ku Klux Klan (KKK) "to control the Jew population." He added that "When I say Jew, I mean the 12 lost tribes of Judah, the blood of Christ, who the people known as the race Black really are" and that "This is who our people are. The blood of Christ. This, as a Christian, is my belief." West also disapproved of his children going to a school that celebrates Kwanzaa, saying "I prefer my kids knew Hanukkah than Kwanzaa. At least it will come with some financial engineering." Fox News redacted these segments in their original broadcast.

That month, an episode of LeBron James's show, The Shop: Uninterrupted, featuring West was not released, as West had allegedly made antisemitic comments while recording the episode. On an October 17 episode of the podcast Drink Champs, recorded the day prior, West claimed that he was being targeted by "the Jewish media" and "Zionist Jews" and said, "You really influenced me to get on this anti-Semite vibe and, you know, I'm here to finish the job. I'm here to not back down. They should've never let you niggas get money." In the same interview, West reiterated his claim that black people are the Lost Tribes of Israel. The same day, West alleged in a televised interview with NewsNation's Chris Cuomo that he was being targeted by a "Jewish Underground Media Mafia", which also led to a confrontation with Cuomo.

A few days after these comments, on October 22, the neo-Nazi Goyim Defense League protested in Los Angeles, hanging a banner that read "Kanye is right about the Jews" above a highway overpass while giving Nazi salutes. The demonstration was widely condemned by Jewish advocacy groups and politicians, some of whom urged West's sponsor, Adidas, to cut ties with him. Jeffrey Abrams of the Anti-Defamation League was quoted as expressing that "[t]hese hate groups are now leveraging the anti-Semitic tropes that Kanye West has been peddling on social media [and] on interviews". On October 27, CNN reported, based on anonymous sources, that West had a "disturbing history of admiring Hitler", had read Hitler's antisemitic manifesto Mein Kampf, and wanted to title his 2018 album (now titled Ye) Hitler. Van Lathan Jr., who previously interviewed West for TMZ, claimed that West made similar comments in a 2018 interview which were edited out before publication.

In response to his antisemitic statements, Vogue, CAA, Balenciaga, Gap, and Adidas terminated their collaborations, sponsorships, and relationships with West. Foot Locker and TJ Maxx removed West's products from their shelves. With the termination of his business relationships, West lost his billionaire status; Forbes estimated his reduced worth at $400 million, coming from his "real estate, cash, his music catalog, and a 5% stake in ex-wife Kim Kardashian's shapewear firm, Skims". On October 26, 2022, West was escorted out of Skechers headquarters in Manhattan Beach, California after he arrived unannounced and uninvited; Skechers said it was "not considering and has no intention of working with West".

Later in December 2022, while speaking to X17, West stated that he does not suffer from bipolar disorder and is not having a psychotic episode, but he "may be slightly autistic, like Rain Man".

Donald Trump–Nick Fuentes meeting
In late November 2022, West was invited by Donald Trump to dine with him at Mar-a-Lago. West arrived at the dinner with three other guests, including Nick Fuentes, a white nationalist and Holocaust denier. Fuentes' presence at the dinner became the subject of much critical media coverage. U.S. president Joe Biden tweeted that "our political leaders should be calling out and rejecting antisemitism wherever it hides", interpreted as a response to Republican Party leaders failing to condemn Trump hosting West and Fuentes. Political correspondent Jonathan Weisman of The New York Times observed that, for American Jews, "the debate since the dinner has brought into focus what may be the most discomfiting moment in U.S. history in a half-century or more."

Timcast IRL interview
Following the visit, West and Fuentes made an appearance on Tim Pool's Timcast IRL podcast on November 28, along with Milo Yiannopoulos. While on the podcast, West went into detail about his meeting with Trump, claiming that it was pushed from October to November by Trump after he announced his 2024 bid for Presidential election as well as stating that Alex Jones told West to bring Yiannopoulos with him, who in turn introduced Fuentes as well. West also continued to make antisemitic remarks and compared his situation to that of Martin Luther King Jr. and Malcolm X. Pool's reluctance to accept West's views angered West, who repeatedly threatened to leave the set, stating that, "I feel like it’s a setup … I’m going to walk the fuck off the show if I’m having to talk about, ‘You can’t say Jewish people did it,’ when every sensible person knows — that Jon Stewart knows — what happened to me, and they took it to far."

After one of West's statements, Pool made a minor concession to West, stating that he believed that "they" had been unfair to him; this then prompted West to ask Pool to clarify what he meant by "they," speculating (along with Fuentes) that it was a euphemism for Jews. When Pool clarified that he meant the corporate press, West, realizing that Pool would not entertain his viewpoints, abruptly left the interview and was followed by Fuentes and Yiannopoulos. Their departure was widely chastised, including by Pool himself, who continued the show afterwards, derogatorily labeling West's exit from his podcast as "woke."

InfoWars interview
On December 1, 2022, West praised Adolf Hitler on InfoWars'', saying "every human being has something of value that they brought to the table, especially Hitler", "I love Jewish people but I also love Nazis", "There's  of things that I  about Hitler;  of things", "I like Hitler", and "I am a Nazi". He also stated that "we got to stop dissing the Nazis all the time", "the Jewish media has made us feel like the Nazis and Hitler have never offered anything of value to the world", and "my accounts have been frozen by the Jewish banks". West also denied the Holocaust and falsely claimed that it was "factually incorrect" that Hitler killed six million Jews. Following the interview, West posted an image on Twitter of a swastika entangled within a Star of David; the symbol is associated with the Raëlian Movement. His Twitter account was then suspended immediately afterwards, with Twitter CEO Elon Musk stating that he had violated Twitter's rules against incitement to violence.

Gavin McInnes interview
On December 6, 2022, West continued to praise Hitler in an interview with Gavin McInnes, founder of the Proud Boys. He said Jewish people should "forgive Hitler today". He compared abortion to the Holocaust, saying "the Holocaust is not the only holocaust. So for them to take that and claim when we have abortions right now. That's eugenics. That's genocide. That's a holocaust that we're dealing with right now." He repeated the antisemitic trope that Jewish people "control" the media and politics. He said that the Jewish people "control America" and "have China scared".

References

Black conservatism in the United States
Holocaust denial in the United States
Kanye West
Neo-Nazism in the United States
West, Kanye
West, Kanye
West, Kanye